Le Prieur rockets (French Fusées Le Prieur) were a type of incendiary air-to-air rocket used in World War I against observation balloons and airships. They were invented by the French lieutenant Yves Le Prieur and were first used in the Battle of Verdun in April 1916.

Development

The Le Prieur rocket was essentially a cardboard tube filled with 200 grams of black powder with a wooden conical head attached (by doped paper or linen tape) and had a triangular knife blade inserted in a slot across its apex forming a spear point. A square-section wooden stick (usually pine) was taped to the fish with about  extending back from the base of the rocket and fitted snugly into a launch tube attached to the aircraft inter-plane struts.

As top French military officers had expressed concerns about fire hazard for the attacking aircraft, Yves Le Prieur first experimented with his weapon by fitting one on a short section of a Voisin aircraft wing bolted on a Piccard Pictet (Pic-Pic) automobile (one of the few period cars with a genuine  capability). As the tests went on with full success, the weapon was soon put into active service.

Method of use

The rockets were fired electrically from the interplane struts supporting the wings of biplanes via a cockpit switch. The switch launched all the rockets consecutively. The rockets were generally fired at a range of 100–150 metres with the aircraft at an inclined dive angle of 45 degrees. The steeper the dive the straighter the trajectory and the more accurate the attack. Attacks were made in the direction of the length of the balloon and against the wind, the pilot taking aim via the plane's existing gun-sight. However, the ignition and discharge of each rocket did not occur immediately and a delay varied slightly from one rocket to another. Thus the pilot had to continue to hold the target in his gun-sight and the dive continued until the last rocket discharged.

It successfully brought down observation balloons, but never managed to bring down a Zeppelin, although it was used to defend the United Kingdom from Zeppelin raids.

Amongst users of the rockets were United Kingdom, France, Belgium and Germany. After planes became equipped with tracer rounds and incendiary bullets which were highly effective against hydrogen filled aerostats, the rockets were gradually abandoned through 1918. Aircraft that were armed with the rockets included the B.E.2, B.E.12, Sopwith Baby, Sopwith Pup, Sopwith Camel, Nieuport 11, Nieuport 16, Nieuport 17, SPAD S.VII, SPAD S.XIII and the Farman HF.20/21. They were usually armed with eight rockets but the B.E.12 had ten and the SPAD 7 had six.

See also

 Rudolf Nebel, the Central Powers pilot who pioneered aerial rocketry for the Luftstreitkräfte

References

External links

 The Pioneers—Yves Le Prieur

World War I weapons of France
Air-to-air rockets